GK Tauri is a young binary system composed of T Tauri-type pre-main sequence stars in the constellation of Taurus about  away, belonging to the Taurus Molecular Cloud.

System 
The stars GV Tauri A (GV Tauri S) and G Tauri B (GV Tauri N) form a wide binary system, with the projected separation between components being 170 AU. Both are strongly shrouded by circumstellar dust - GV Tauri A  by 30 magnitudes and the GV Tauri B up to 59 magnitudes in the V band. Both components are suspected to be binaries themselves, as they produce strongly ionized jets and molecular outflows.

Properties 
Both members of the binary system are medium-mass objects still contracting towards the main sequence and accreting mass, although accretion rates remain highly uncertain as of 2009.

Protoplanetary system
The disk of GV Tauri B is rich in carbon monoxide, hydrogen cyanide and, unusually, methane.

References 

Binary stars
T Tauri stars
Circumstellar disks
Taurus (constellation)
J04292373+2433002
Tauri, GV